HMS Melville was a 74-gun third rate ship of the line of the Royal Navy, launched on 17 February 1817 at Bombay Dockyard.

From 19 January 1836 until August 1837 she served in North America and the West Indies as the flagship of Vice-Admiral Peter Halkett and was commanded by Captain Peter John Douglas.  From 1 September 1837 to 1841 she was the flagship of Rear-Admiral George Elliot and was captained by Richard Saunders Dundas, during this time she served at the Cape of Good Hope and in the East Indies and was present during the First Opium War with China.

During the Opium War 32 officers, 351 sailors and 75 Royal Marines served aboard her of whom 16 sailors and four marines would be killed in action at the capture of Bocca Tigris on 7 January 1841 and the subsequent campaign along the Pearl River to Canton.

She was converted to serve as a hospital ship in 1857, and was sold out of the navy in 1873. Her sale in Hong Kong raised HK$35,000 which was used to purchase the Royal Naval Hospital at Mount Shadwell.

Notes

References

Lavery, Brian (2003) The Ship of the Line - Volume 1: The development of the battlefleet 1650-1850. Conway Maritime Press. .

External links
 

Ships of the line of the Royal Navy
Black Prince-class ships of the line
1817 ships
First Opium War ships of the United Kingdom